JJ Breet (born 14 June 1991) is a South African rugby union player, currently playing for Italian Top12 side Rugby Viadana. His regular position is lock.

Career

Youth and Varsity Rugby
Breet represented  at the Under–18 Craven Week tournaments in 2008 and 2009, also earning a call-up to the South African Under–18 High Performance Squad in 2009.

He represented the  team in the 2010 Under-19 Provincial Championship competition, scoring seven tries in his thirteen appearances, as well as the  team in the Under-21 competitions in 2011 and 2012.

Blue Bulls

Golden Lions
He made a total of five appearances for them in that competition, including coming on as a late substitute in the final, which the Lions won 42–28.

His Currie Cup debut came a few months later when he came on as a half-time substitute in the Lions' dramatic 31–31 draw against .

Pumas

Viadana
In March 2016, Italian National Championship of Excellence side Viadana announced that Breet joined them.

References

South African rugby union players
Living people
1991 births
Rugby union players from Pretoria
Blue Bulls players
Golden Lions players
Tshwane University of Technology alumni
Rugby union locks